Caligula are a band from Sydney, Australia, who produced electro rock music in the early 1990s. They're best known for their 1994 album, Rubenesque, which peaked at number 13 on the ARIA charts and became a household name
with their hit version of Smokey Robinson’s Tears Of A Clown .
They spent a big chunk of the 90’s touring with acts like Depeche Mode, Pop Will Eat Itself, Neds Atomic Dustbin, Ride, Headless Chickens and many more .
The band reformed in 2017 and started recording and releasing new material in 2021.
3 new singles have been released to critical acclaim and the band has fast become a popular touring act again, sharing festival stages with the cream of the crop of success 90’s Aussie bands .

History
Caligula was composed of five members: vocalist Ashley Rothschild, guitarist James McKinnon, drummer Dave Macken, Jamie Fonti (keyboards and backing singer), and bass guitarist Sean Fonti. The band also included Dave Ross and Mitchell Foley as founding members.
In 1990 and 1991, the band released two EPs, before a compilation album including both EPs, titled Got One.

In 1994, they released the album Rubenesque and received national airplay on Triple J and Triple M with the songs "Tears of a Clown" (a remake of the Smokey Robinson & the Miracles song).

Ashley Rothschild left Caligula, leading to their demise. The Fonti Brothers then created the band Primary with singer Connie Mitchell. Rothschild currently fronts the bands Panic Syndrome and Graveyard Rock Stars and teaches at Big Music Studios in Crows Nest.

In 2018 the band reunited to support Pop Will Eat Itself on the East Coast dates of their Australian tour.

Discography

Albums
{| class="wikitable plainrowheaders" style="text-align:center;" border="1"
! scope="col" rowspan="2" style="width:11em;"| Title
! scope="col" rowspan="2" style="width:17em;"| Details
! scope="col" colspan="1" | Peak chart positions
|-
! scope="col" style="width:3em;font-size:90%;" | AUS
|-
! scope="row"| Got One
|
 Released: 1991
 Label: Timberyard Records (SAW 015) 
 Format: CD
 Compilation of Caligula and Got One EPs
| -
|-
! scope="row"| Rubenesque|
 Released: March 1994
 Label: Mercury, Phonogram (518994 2)
 Format: CD
| 13
|}

EPs

Singles

Awards
ARIA Music Awards
The ARIA Music Awards is an annual awards ceremony that recognises excellence, innovation, and achievement across all genres of Australian music. Caligula were nominated for one award.

|-
| 1993
| Caligula''
| ARIA Award for Best New Talent
| 
|-

References

Australian rock music groups
New South Wales musical groups
Timberyard Records artists
Mercury Records artists